Dossena is a comune (municipality) in the Province of Bergamo in the Italian region of Lombardy, located about  northeast of Milan and about  north of Bergamo.

Dossena borders the following municipalities: Lenna, Roncobello, San Giovanni Bianco, San Pellegrino Terme, Serina. The parish church (15th century) has paintings by Paolo Veronese.

References